Jim Green (May 25, 1943 – February 28, 2012) was an American-Canadian who was a longshoreman, taxicab driver, community activist, non-profit housing developer, municipal politician, university instructor and development consultant.

Early life and education
Born in Birmingham, Alabama, Green moved to Canada to avoid being drafted for the Vietnam War. Green held a Masters in Anthropology from the University of British Columbia, a Bachelor of Arts from the University of South Carolina, and studied at the Sorbonne, the Millennium Film Institute in New York, and the University of Colorado.

Career
Early in his career, Green worked as a longshoreman and a taxicab driver.

Green was an advocate for the city's Downtown Eastside and led the development of many housing projects, including the  experimental Woodward's building redevelopment designed by architect Gregory Henriquez He was a development consultant for developers and non-profit community groups.  In 2009 he left his role as CEO of the Misty Isles Economic Development Society to take a position working with Millennium Developments Ltd. on the 2010 Olympic Village development in Vancouver.

Green taught opera and architecture at the University of British Columbia and Anthropology at Simon Fraser University, and co-founded the University of British Columbia Urban Field School. Green was chair of Four Corners Community Savings, which was closed by the Gordon Campbell led BC Government. He served on the board of the Federation of Canadian Municipalities.

Green co-founded the Portland Hotel Society which operates Insite, the first legal safe injection site in North America.

Political career
In 2002 he was elected to Vancouver City Council as a member of the Coalition of Progressive Electors (COPE), and subsequently, with mayor Larry Campbell, councillor Raymond Louie, and councillor Tim Stevenson left to form a new party, Vision Vancouver. Under the Vision Vancouver banner, he unsuccessfully ran for mayor in 2005, losing to Sam Sullivan by 3,747 votes.  Some blamed voter confusion for his loss, as there was an unknown candidate named "James Green" who received 4,273 votes.

It was the second time Green had run for mayor unsuccessfully, having been beaten as a member of COPE by then-NPA mayor Gordon Campbell in 1990. Six years later, Green again faced Campbell, this time in the 1996 provincial election for the MLA seat in Vancouver-Point Grey. Green, a New Democrat, was defeated by BC Liberal leader and future premier Gordon Campbell 12,637 to 11,074.

In 2008 Green supported Gregor Robertson in his successful run for mayor of Vancouver.

Death
In February 2012, his family released a brief statement saying he had suffered a serious recurrence of the lung cancer he had previously battled. At 06:15 PST on February 28, 2012, Green died following his battle with lung cancer.

References

1943 births
2012 deaths
American emigrants to Canada
Canadian schoolteachers
Deaths from cancer in British Columbia
Deaths from lung cancer
Vietnam War draft evaders
Politicians from Birmingham, Alabama
Academic staff of Simon Fraser University
University of British Columbia alumni
Academic staff of the University of British Columbia
University of Colorado alumni
University of Paris alumni
University of South Carolina alumni
Coalition of Progressive Electors councillors
Vision Vancouver councillors
American expatriates in France